The World According to John Coltrane is a 1990 documentary about jazz saxophonist John Coltrane.

Overview
The World According to John Coltrane, directed by Robert Palmer moves chronologically. It shows interviews with musicians who worked with Coltrane, such as Rashied Ali, Jimmy Heath, Roscoe Mitchell, and Wayne Shorter, and film clips of live performances. One brief clip shows Coltrane playing "So What" with Miles Davis in 1959. Shown, too, is a performance by the classic quartet of Coltrane, Jimmy Garrison, Elvin Jones, and McCoy Tyner at a jazz festival, and the quartet playing with Eric Dolphy. Coltrane's live performance of "Alabama" is shown in full. The documentary omits commentary by scholars in favor of a narrated chronology of his life, interviews with his contemporaries, and live film clips.

Tracks
A Love Supreme 
Alabama
Blue Monk
Dahomey Dance
Dear Lord
Eight Miles High
Giant Steps
Gospel Song 1
Gospel Song 2
Hot House
Impressions
Impressions 2
India
Koko
Moroccan Folk Song
My Favorite Things
My Favorite Things 2
Naima
Number One
Raga Bhimpalisi
Roscoe In Morocco
Round Midnight
So What
Things To Come

References

Documentary films about jazz music and musicians
John Coltrane
1990 films
1990s English-language films